The 2004 season of the Cook Islands Round Cup was the thirty first recorded season of top flight association football competition in the Cook Islands, with any results between 1951 and 1969 and also in 1986 and 1988–1990 currently unknown. Nikao Sokattack won the championship, their second recorded championship. Tupapa Maraerenga were runners-up, with Matavera finishing in third place following a seven match unbeaten run at the end of the season.

League table
Nikao Sokattack won the league, which was played on a round robin home and away basis, although only a partial table is available.

Known results
Only partial results are known:

References

Cook Islands Round Cup seasons
Cook
football